Were-hyena is a neologism coined in analogy to werewolf for therianthropy involving hyenas. It is common in the folklore of the Arabian Peninsula, the Levant, North Africa, the Horn of Africa, and the Near East as well as some adjacent territories. Unlike werewolves and other therianthropes, which are usually portrayed as being originally human, some werehyena lore tells of how they can also be hyenas disguised as humans.

African cultures
In Somalia, it is traditionally believed that Qori Ismaris ("One who rubs himself with a stick") was a man who could transform himself into a "hyena-man" by rubbing himself with a magic stick at nightfall and by repeating this process could return to his human state before dawn.

In Ethiopia, it is traditionally believed that every blacksmith, whose trade is hereditary, is really a wizard or witch with the power to change into a hyena.  These blacksmith werehyenas are believed to rob graves at midnight and are referred to as bouda (also spelled buda).  They are viewed with suspicion by most countrymen. Belief in the bouda is also present in Sudan and Tanzania, as well as Morocco, where some Berbers regard them as a man or woman who nightly turns into a hyena and resumes human shape at dawn. Many Ethiopian Christians characterize Ethiopian Jews as being bouda, accusing them of unearthing Christian corpses and consuming them; the commonality of blacksmithing as a traditional profession for Jewish men in Ethiopia may be a reason for the connection between the two beliefs.

In the Kanuri language of the former Bornu Empire in the Lake Chad region, werehyenas are referred to as bultungin which translates into "I change myself into a hyena". It was once traditionally believed that one or two of the villages in the region was populated entirely by werehyenas, such as Kabultiloa. Any such person is called ngadza.

In the folklore of western Sudanic peoples, there is a hybrid creature, a human who is nightly transformed into a cannibalistic monster that terrorizes people, especially lovers. The creature is often portrayed as a magically powerful healer, blacksmith, or woodcutter in its human form, but recognizable through signs like a hairy body, red and gleaming eyes, and a nasal voice.

Members of the Korè cult of the Bambara people in Mali “become” hyenas by imitating the animals' behavior through masks and roleplay. These are evocative of the hyenas' reviled habits and may also be used to evoke fear among the participants, leading them to avoid such habits and traits in their own lives.

Other cultures
Al-Doumairy, in his Hawayan Al-Koubra (1406), wrote that hyenas are vampiric creatures that attack people at night and suck the blood from their necks. Arab folklore tells of how hyenas can mesmerise victims with their eyes or sometimes with their pheromones.

A Persian medical treatise written in 1376 tells how to cure people known as kaftar, who are said to be “half-man, half-hyena”, who have the habit of slaughtering children.

The Greeks, until the end of the 19th century, believed that the bodies of werewolves, if not destroyed, would haunt battlefields as vampiric hyenas which drank the blood of dying soldiers.

Popular culture

Werehyenas have appeared in popular culture:

 In DC Comics, Firestorm villain Hyena is an example of a werehyena and there had been different versions of this character.

 The Monsters episode "One Wolf's Family" features a werehyena named Stanley.

 The 1994 film The Heart's Cry features a werehyena.

 The Buffy the Vampire Slayer episode "The Pack" featured creatures similar to the werehyena.

 Ilona Andrews's Kate Daniels urban fantasy series features clan of werehyenas.

 The 2011 film Hyenas featured some werehyenas.

The 2021 fantasy novel Skin of the Sea by Natasha Bowen features werehyenas.

See also
 Blood libel
 Crocotta
 Leopard Society
 Shapeshifting
 Skin-walker
 Were

References

External links
 Book Review: The Hyena People: Ethiopian Jews In Christian Ethiopia

African legendary creatures
African witchcraft
Arabian legendary creatures
Mythological canines
Therianthropes